North Beverly station is an MBTA Commuter Rail station in Beverly, Massachusetts. Located in North Beverly, it serves the Newburyport/Rockport Line. The station has two low side platforms serving the line's two tracks, with mini-high platforms to provide accessibility. The station originally opened by the mid-1850s. The station building was converted to a hamburger stand by 1968, but later demolished. , improvements to the accessible mini-high platforms are in design.

The station is also the northern terminus of MBTA bus route , which connects North Beverly to downtown Beverly and Salem.

References

External links

MBTA – North Beverly
Station from Dodge Street from Google Maps Street View

MBTA Commuter Rail stations in Essex County, Massachusetts
Stations along Boston and Maine Railroad lines